Doug Taylor may refer to:
 Doug Taylor (historian), author of multiple books about Toronto, or set in Toronto
 Douglas Graham Taylor, Saskatchewan politician